Berland River is a stream in Alberta, Canada. It is a tributary of the Athabasca River.

A former variant name was "Baptiste Berland River".

See also
List of rivers of Alberta

References

Rivers of Alberta